Lisa Cecilia Thomasson-Bosiö (1878–1932), better known by her stage names Lisa Thomasson and Lapp-Lisa, was a Swedish singer of Sámi descent.

See also
Anna-Lisa Öst (1889–1974), Swedish gospel singer, who performed under the name "Lapp-Lisa".

Further reading
 

1878 births
1932 deaths
People from Jämtland
Swedish Sámi musicians
Swedish women singers
Swedish folk singers
Swedish Salvationists
Swedish Sámi people